John Fleming (November 1697–1756) was a judge in Cumberland County, Virginia who served in the Virginia House of Burgesses for more than a decade, working with John Robinson and Peyton Randolph. In 1764, he worked with Patrick Henry, George Johnston and Robert Munford on the Virginia Stamp Act Resolutions. His son William Fleming later held his seat in the House of Burgesses, representing Cumberland County.

During the John Chiswell scandal, John Fleming was the judge who ordered John Chiswell to be jailed.

References

Mayer, Henry. A Son of Thunder, Patrick Henry and the American Republic. New York: Franklin Watts, 1986.

People of Virginia in the American Revolution
House of Burgesses members
1697 births
1766 deaths
People from Cumberland County, Virginia